The Hon. Charles Francis Stein Sr. (1866–1939) was a judge in the Baltimore, Maryland City courts.  He was admitted to the bar in 1889, and formed the firm of Hennighausen & Stein in 1901 along with Kenneth Weinberger.  He was appointed to the Supreme Bench of Baltimore City by Governor Albert C. Ritchie and served as an Associate Judge from 1921-1936.

References
 Historical & Biographical Series at the Maryland State Archives

Maryland state court judges
Baltimore City College alumni
1866 births
1939 deaths